Exponential smoothing is a rule of thumb technique for smoothing time series data using the exponential window function. Whereas in the simple moving average the past observations are weighted equally, exponential functions are used to assign exponentially decreasing weights over time. It is an easily learned and easily applied procedure for making some determination based on prior assumptions by the user, such as seasonality. Exponential smoothing is often used for analysis of time-series data.

Exponential smoothing is one of many window functions commonly applied to smooth data in signal processing, acting as low-pass filters to remove high-frequency noise. This method is preceded by Poisson's use of recursive exponential window functions in convolutions from the 19th century, as well as Kolmogorov and Zurbenko's use of recursive moving averages from their studies of turbulence in the 1940s.

When the sequence of observations begins at time , the simplest form of exponential smoothing is given by the formulas:

Basic (simple) exponential smoothing
The use of the exponential window function is first attributed to Poisson as an extension of a numerical analysis technique from the 17th century, and later adopted by the signal processing community in the 1940s. Here, exponential smoothing is the application of the exponential, or Poisson, window function. Exponential smoothing was first suggested in the statistical literature without citation to previous work by Robert Goodell Brown in 1956, and then expanded by Charles C. Holt in 1957. The formulation below, which is the one commonly used, is attributed to Brown and is known as "Brown’s simple exponential smoothing". All the methods of Holt, Winters and Brown may be seen as a simple application of recursive filtering, first found in the 1940s to convert finite impulse response (FIR) filters to infinite impulse response filters.

The simplest form of exponential smoothing is given by the formula:

In other words, the smoothed statistic  is a simple weighted average of the current observation  and the previous smoothed statistic . Simple exponential smoothing is easily applied, and it produces a smoothed statistic as soon as two observations are available.
The term smoothing factor applied to  here is something of a misnomer, as larger values of  actually reduce the level of smoothing, and in the limiting case with  = 1 the output series is just the current observation. Values of  close to one have less of a smoothing effect and give greater weight to recent changes in the data, while values of  closer to zero have a greater smoothing effect and are less responsive to recent changes.

There is no formally correct procedure for choosing . Sometimes the statistician's judgment is used to choose an appropriate factor.

Unlike some other smoothing methods, such as the simple moving average, this technique does not require any minimum number of observations to be made before it begins to produce results. In practice, however, a "good average" will not be achieved until several samples have been averaged together; for example, a constant signal will take approximately  stages to reach 95% of the actual value. To accurately reconstruct the original signal without information loss, all stages of the exponential moving average must also be available, because older samples decay in weight exponentially. This is in contrast to a simple moving average, in which some samples can be skipped without as much loss of information due to the constant weighting of samples within the average. If a known number of samples will be missed, one can adjust a weighted average for this as well, by giving equal weight to the new sample and all those to be skipped.

This simple form of exponential smoothing is also known as an exponentially weighted moving average (EWMA). Technically it can also be classified as an autoregressive integrated moving average (ARIMA) (0,1,1) model with no constant term.

Time constant
The time constant of an exponential moving average is the amount of time for the smoothed response of a unit step function to reach  of the original signal. The relationship between this time constant, and the smoothing factor, is given by the formula:

, thus  

where  is the sampling time interval of the discrete time implementation. If the sampling time is fast compared to the time constant then

Choosing the initial smoothed value
Because exponential smoothing requires that at each stage we have the previous forecast, it is not obvious how to get the method started. We could assume that the initial forecast is equal to the initial value of demand; however, this approach has a serious drawback. Exponential smoothing puts substantial weight on past observations, so the initial value of demand will have an unreasonably large effect on early forecasts. This problem can be overcome by allowing the process to evolve for a reasonable number of periods (10 or more) and using the average of the demand during those periods as the initial forecast.

Optimization
For every exponential smoothing method we also need to choose the value for the smoothing parameters. For simple exponential smoothing, there is only one smoothing parameter (α), but for the methods that follow there is usually more than one smoothing parameter.

There are cases where the smoothing parameters may be chosen in a subjective manner – the forecaster specifies the value of the smoothing parameters based on previous experience. However, a more robust and objective way to obtain values for the unknown parameters included in any exponential smoothing method is to estimate them from the observed data.

The unknown parameters and the initial values for any exponential smoothing method can be estimated by minimizing the sum of squared errors (SSE). Hence we find the values of the unknown parameters and the initial values that minimize

 

Unlike the regression case (where we have formulae to directly compute the regression coefficients which minimize the SSE) this involves a non-linear minimization problem and we need to use an optimization tool to perform this.

"Exponential" naming
The name 'exponential smoothing' is attributed to the use of the exponential window function during convolution. It is no longer attributed to Holt, Winters & Brown.

By direct substitution of the defining equation for simple exponential smoothing back into itself we find that

In other words, as time passes the smoothed statistic  becomes the weighted average of a greater and greater number of the past observations , and the weights assigned to previous observations are proportional to the terms of the geometric progression

 

A geometric progression is the discrete version of an exponential function, so this is where the name for this smoothing method originated according to Statistics lore.

Comparison with moving average
Exponential smoothing and moving average have similar defects of introducing a lag relative to the input data. While this can be corrected by shifting the result by half the window length for a symmetrical kernel, such as a moving average or gaussian, it is unclear how appropriate this would be for exponential smoothing. They also both have roughly the same distribution of forecast error when α = 2/(k + 1). They differ in that exponential smoothing takes into account all past data, whereas moving average only takes into account k past data points. Computationally speaking, they also differ in that moving average requires that the past k data points, or the data point at lag k + 1 plus the most recent forecast value, to be kept, whereas exponential smoothing only needs the most recent forecast value to be kept.

In the signal processing literature, the use of non-causal (symmetric) filters is commonplace, and the exponential window function is broadly used in this fashion, but a different terminology is used: exponential smoothing is equivalent to a first-order infinite-impulse response (IIR) filter and moving average is equivalent to a finite impulse response filter with equal weighting factors.

Double exponential smoothing (Holt linear)
Simple exponential smoothing does not do well when there is a trend in the data.  In such situations, several methods were devised under the name "double exponential smoothing" or "second-order exponential smoothing," which is the recursive application of an exponential filter twice, thus being termed "double exponential smoothing". This nomenclature is similar to quadruple exponential smoothing, which also references its recursion depth. 
The basic idea behind double exponential smoothing is to introduce a term to take into account the possibility of a series exhibiting some form of trend. This slope component is itself updated via exponential smoothing.

One method, works as follows:

Double exponential smoothing is given by the formulas

To forecast beyond  is given by the approximation:

 

Setting the initial value  is a matter of preference.

Note that F0 is undefined (there is no estimation for time 0), and according to the definition F1=s0+b0, which is well defined, thus further values can be evaluated.

A second method, referred to as either Brown's linear exponential smoothing (LES) or Brown's double exponential smoothing works as follows.

where at, the estimated level at time t and bt, the estimated trend at time t are:

Triple exponential smoothing (Holt Winters)
Triple exponential smoothing applies exponential smoothing three times, which is commonly used when there are three high frequency signals to be removed from a time series under study. There are different types of seasonality: 'multiplicative' and 'additive' in nature, much like addition and multiplication are basic operations in mathematics.

If every month of December we sell 10,000 more apartments than we do in November the seasonality is additive in nature. However, if we sell 10% more apartments in the summer months than we do in the winter months the seasonality is multiplicative in nature. Multiplicative seasonality can be represented as a constant factor, not an absolute amount.

Triple exponential smoothing was first suggested by Holt's student, Peter Winters, in 1960 after reading a signal processing book from the 1940s on exponential smoothing. Holt's novel idea was to repeat filtering an odd number of times greater than 1 and less than 5, which was popular with scholars of previous eras. While recursive filtering had been used previously, it was applied twice and four times to coincide with the Hadamard conjecture, while triple application required more than double the operations of singular convolution. The use of a triple application is considered a rule of thumb technique, rather than one based on theoretical foundations and has often been over-emphasized by practitioners.
-
Suppose we have a sequence of observations , beginning at time  with a cycle of seasonal change of length .

The method calculates a trend line for the data as well as seasonal indices that weight the values in the trend line based on where that time point falls in the cycle of length .

We wish to estimate  at every time mod  in the cycle that the observations take on. As a rule of thumb, a minimum of two full seasons (or  periods) of historical data is needed to initialize a set of seasonal factors.

Triple exponential smoothing with multiplicative seasonality is given by the formulas

The general formula for the initial trend estimate  is:

If  is the number of complete cycles present in your data, then:

where

Triple exponential smoothing with additive seasonality is given by:

Implementations in statistics packages 
 R: the HoltWinters function in the stats package and ets function in the forecast package (a more complete implementation, generally resulting in a better performance).
 Python: the holtwinters module of the statsmodels package allow for simple, double and triple exponential smoothing.
 IBM SPSS includes Simple, Simple Seasonal, Holt's Linear Trend, Brown's Linear Trend, Damped Trend, Winters' Additive, and Winters' Multiplicative in the Time-Series modeling procedure within its Statistics and Modeler statistical packages. The default Expert Modeler feature evaluates all seven exponential smoothing models and ARIMA models with a range of nonseasonal and seasonal p, d, and q values, and selects the model with the lowest Bayesian Information Criterion statistic.
 Stata: tssmooth command
 LibreOffice 5.2
 Microsoft Excel 2016

See also
 Autoregressive moving average model (ARMA)
 Errors and residuals in statistics
 Moving average
 Continued fraction

Notes

External links
 Lecture notes on exponential smoothing (Robert Nau, Duke University)
 Data Smoothing by Jon McLoone, The Wolfram Demonstrations Project
 The Holt–Winters Approach to Exponential Smoothing: 50 Years Old and Going Strong by Paul Goodwin (2010) Foresight: The International Journal of Applied Forecasting
 Algorithms for Unevenly Spaced Time Series: Moving Averages and Other Rolling Operators by Andreas Eckner

Time series